Jo Freya (born 4 December 1960) is an English saxophonist, clarinettist and singer.

She was born Jo Fraser, but changed her name to Jo Freya as a condition of joining the actors' union Equity, which does not allow two of its members to share the same name. She performs mainly folk music and world music and is part of the bands Blowzabella, Old Swan Band and Token Women, as well as performing and / or recording with Lal Waterson, Pete Morton, Maalstroom, and with her sister, Fi Fraser.

She is part of the Lal Waterson Project, in memory of Waterson and in celebration of her work.

Discography 
Solo albums
 Traditional Songs of England (1993)
 Traditional Songs of Wales (1993)
 Lush (1996)
 Lal (2007)
 Female Smuggler (2008)

Anthology
 Migrating Bird – The Songs of Lal Waterson (2007)

With Pete Morton
 Jo Freya & Pete Morton (1997)

As a member of Blowzabella
 A Richer Dust (1988)
 Vanilla (1990)
 Octomento (2007)
 Dance (2010)

As a member of Fraser Sisters
 The Fraser Sisters (1998)
 Going Around (2001)

As a member of Freyja
 Freyja (1996)
 One Bathroom (2001)

As a member of The Old Swan Band
 No Reels (1977)
 Old Swan Brand (1979)
 Gamesters, Pickpockets and Harlots (1981)
 The Old Swan Band (1983)
 Still Swanning After All These Years (1995)
 Swan-Upmanship (2004)

As a member of Tanteeka
 A New Tradition (1997)

As a member of Token Women
 The Rhythm Method (1993)
 Out To Lunch (1995)
 Elsa (2001)

In conjunction with Maalstroom
 Meet (2010)

As a member of Moirai
 Sideways (2015)

References

External links
Official Website
MySpace Page

1960 births
Living people
English folk musicians
English folk singers
Place of birth missing (living people)
English saxophonists
English clarinetists
Women saxophonists
21st-century saxophonists
21st-century clarinetists